Justin Pender (born October 25, 1988) is a Canadian professional ice hockey defenceman. He is currently playing for the Clarenville Caribou's of the Central West Senior Hockey League in Newfoundland & Labrador.

Prior to turning professional, Pender played major junior hockey in the Quebec Major Junior Hockey League with the Halifax Mooseheads.

On November 15, 2011, the Bakersfield Condors claimed Pender off waivers after he was let go by the Toledo Walleye.

On January 28, 2017 Pender was suspended from regular season play for hitting a referee in the head with a water bottle during a game against the Grand Falls Cataracts

References

External links

1988 births
Living people
Canadian ice hockey defencemen
Halifax Mooseheads players
Ice hockey people from Newfoundland and Labrador
Lowell Devils players
Sportspeople from St. John's, Newfoundland and Labrador
Toledo Walleye players
Trenton Devils players